St. Michael is an unincorporated community and census-designated place in Cambria County, Pennsylvania, United States. Its ZIP code is 15951. It was formerly part of the St. Michael-Sidman census-designated place in Cambria County, before splitting into two separate CDPs for the 2010 census. As of the 2010 census the population of St. Michael was 408.

The community of Sidman is one mile southeast of St. Michael, also in the valley of the South Fork.

References

Census-designated places in Pennsylvania
Census-designated places in Cambria County, Pennsylvania